Plyasitsyno is a rural locality (a village) in Sergeikhinskoye Rural Settlement, Kameshkovsky District, Vladimir Oblast, Russia. The population was 85 as of 2010.

Geography 
Plyasitsyno is located 18 km northwest of Kameshkovo (the district's administrative centre) by road. Sergeikha is the nearest rural locality.

References 

Rural localities in Kameshkovsky District